The 1983 Detroit Lions season was the 54th season in franchise history. Despite a 1–4 start, the Lions rallied to finish with a 9–7 record. They were able to rise to the top of a weak NFC Central (three of the other four teams went 8–8, and Tampa Bay tied for the NFL's worst record at 2–14), to claim their first division championship since 1957, made the playoffs in a non-strike season for the first time since 1970, and the first time they would make the playoffs in consecutive seasons for the first time since playing for the NFL championship in 1952, 1953 and 1954. The Lions would not return to the postseason for another eight years and not do so in consecutive seasons until doing it three straight years from 1993-1995.

The offense ranked 15th in the NFL in points scored, leaving the defense to carry the load. The Lions’ defense turned out to be the second-best in the league in points allowed, keyed defensive tackle Doug English and his 13 sacks. English was the team’s only Pro Bowler, though he also got some help from defensive end William Gay, who registered 13½ sacks of his own. In the NFC playoffs, the Lions lead the San Francisco 49ers late into the fourth quarter, until Joe Montana drove the 49ers down the field for a 14-yard touchdown pass to Freddie Solomon to give the 49ers a 24–23 lead. The Lions would have a chance to win the game, as Gary Danielson drove them into field goal range, but placekicker Eddie Murray missed a 44-yard field goal with five seconds remaining. 

The last remaining active member of the 1983 Detroit Lions was kicker Eddie Murray, who played his final NFL game in the 2000 season, although he missed the 1996 and 1998 seasons.

Offseason

NFL Draft

Roster

Regular season

Schedule

Game summaries

Week 1

Week 11 at Oilers

Billy Sims, rather than be tackled during a rushing attempt, ran at, jumped, and, while fully airborne, kicked Oilers cornerback Steve Brown in the head.

Standings

Postseason

References 

 Detroit Lions on Pro Football Reference
 Detroit Lions on jt-sw.com
 Detroit Lions on The Football Database

Detroit Lions
Detroit Lions seasons
NFC Central championship seasons
Detroit Lions